{{Speciesbox
|image = Dimorphocalyx glabellus leaves.jpg
|genus = Dimorphocalyx
|species = glabellus
|authority = (Thwaites
|subdivision_ranks = Varieties
|subdivision = [[Dimorphocalyx glabellus var. lawianus|Dimorphocalyx glabellus var. lawianus]] 
}}Dimorphocalyx glabellus'' is a species of plant in the family Euphorbiaceae. It is a small evergreen tree endemic to Sri Lanka.

In culture
It is known as "weli wenna" in Sinhala and "tentukki" in Tamil.

Uses 
Whole plant is used as an important medicinal plant in Ayurveda.

References
 http://indiabiodiversity.org/species/show/263237
 http://www.theplantlist.org/tpl/record/kew-61904
 http://www.discoverlife.org/mp/20q?search=Dimorphocalyx+glabellus

Codiaeae
Endemic flora of Sri Lanka